Shira Ichilov (born 8 August 2002) is an Israeli ice dancer, who currently competes with Volodymyr Byelikov. With her former skating partner, Laurent Abecassis, she competed at the 2021 World Championships. With her former skating partner, Vadim Davidovich, she is the 2019 Israeli national champion and has competed in the final segment at two ISU Championships.

Personal life 
Shira Ichilov was born on 8 August 2002 in Tel Aviv, Israel.

Career

2016–2017 season 
Ichilov began skating with Vadim Davidovich in July 2016, coached by Galit Chait in the U.S. In November, making their international debut, Ichilov/Davidovich finished tenth in junior ice dancing at the 2016 Tallinn Trophy. In March, they placed twenty-sixth in the short dance at the 2017 World Junior Championships in Taipei, Taiwan. Their placement was not sufficient to advance to the free dance.

2017–2018 season 
In September, Ichilov/Davidovich debuted on the ISU Junior Grand Prix series, finishing sixth in Salzburg, Austria, and then fourth in Riga, Latvia. After taking silver in the junior event at the 2017 Minsk-Arena Ice Star and placing fourth at the 2017 Golden Spin of Zagreb, they became the Israeli national junior champions. In March, the duo competed at the 2018 World Junior Championships in Sofia, Bulgaria; they qualified to the final segment and finished seventeenth overall. It was Davidovich's final season of age-eligibility for junior events.

2018–2019 season 
Making their senior international debut, Ichilov/Davidovich finished ninth at the 2018 CS Finlandia Trophy in October. They placed twelfth at the Volvo Open Cup and 10th at the 2018 CS Golden Spin of Zagreb before taking the Israeli national title.

In January, the two qualified to the free dance at the 2019 European Championships in Minsk, Belarus. They finished twentieth overall, having ranked twentieth in both segments. The two split following the 2019 World Championships, where they finished twenty-fifth in the rhythm dance and failed to qualify to the free dance.

2019–2020 season 
Ichilov partnered with France's Laurent Abecassis to compete for Israel. They placed twelfth at 2020 Egna Dance Trophy and then won gold at 2020 Jégvirág Cup. Ichilov/Abecassis were scheduled to make their World Championship debut at the 2020 edition in Montreal, but these were cancelled as a result of the COVID-19 pandemic.

2020–2021 season 
With the pandemic continuing to limit international competitions, Ichilov/Abecassis competed only at the 2021 World Championships in Stockholm, where they placed twenty-sixth in the rhythm dance and did not advance to the free dance.

2021–2022 season 
Ichilov/Abecassis competed at the 2021 CS Nebelhorn Trophy, seeking to qualify a berth for Israel at the 2022 Winter Olympics. They placed tenth at the event, outside of qualification. Afterward, Ichilov announced that their partnership had ended due to Abecassis deciding to retire from competitive skating.

Following the dissolution of her partnership, Ichilov formed a new partnership with Ukrainian ice dancer Volodymyr Byelikov. They debuted at the Israeli championships, winning the silver medal, before earning their international minimums at the Bavarian Open, placing sixth. They were fourth at the Egna Trophy, before making their World Championship debut at the 2022 World Championships in Montpellier. They placed twenty-first, and were the first team to miss qualifying for the free dance.

Programs

With Byelikov

With Abecassis

With Davidovich

Competitive highlights 
GP: Grand Prix; CS: Challenger Series; JGP: Junior Grand Prix

With Byelikov

With Abecassis

With Davidovich

References

External links 
 
 
 

2002 births
Israeli female ice dancers
Living people
Sportspeople from Tel Aviv